Fastrack is an Indian fashion accessory retail brand, launched in 1998 as a sub-brand of Titan Watches. In 2005, Fastrack was spun off as an independent brand targeting the urban youth and growing fashion industry in India.
Fastrack began opening retail stores throughout the country. The first store was opened in early 2009.

See also
 Cromā
 Tata Sky

References

External links
Fastrack website

Watch brands
Watchmaking conglomerates
Watch manufacturing companies of India
Fashion accessory brands
Clothing companies established in 1998
1998 establishments in Delhi
Indian brands
Titan Company
Manufacturing companies based in Delhi